Sarah Bibber (or Vibber or Vibert; born  – year of death unknown) was involved in the infamous Salem witch trials in 1692, both as an accuser of witchcraft, as well as being accused of being a witch herself.

Bibber was one of the "afflicted" who testified against the accused in the Salem Witch Trials of 1692. She is mentioned in indictments, gave depositions and testified under oath against 15 people accused of witchcraft. These were Mary Bradbury, George Burroughs, Giles Corey, Mary Easty, Sarah Good, Dorcas Hoar, Elizabeth How, George Jacobs, Sr., Susannah Martin, Rebecca Nurse, Alice Parker, John Proctor, Ann Pudeator, Job Tookey and John Willard. She also was mentioned in the indictment of Mary Witheridge.

Others, including John and Lydia Porter, Joseph Fowler, Thomas and Mary Jacobs, Richard Walker and Sarah Nurse testified against Bibber, claiming that she was involved in witchcraft. In 1692 Bibber's age was given as being about 36 years old. She was married to John Bibber and they had a 4-year-old child. Various court documents list their town of residence as Salem or Wenham. Her surname is variously given in the documents as Bibber, Biber and Vibber.

Sarah Bibber v. Sarah Good:

Bibber was described by those who testified against her as a "loose-tongued creature, addicted to fits," a woman who quarreled often with her husband when she would call him "very bad names," would have "strange fits when she was crossed," a woman of turbulent spirit and "double tongued." She was observed to be "very idle in her calling" and given to gossiping and making mischief among her neighbors.

The testimony of Thomas and Mary Jacobs against Bibber stated that

 ... Bibber would be very often speaking against one and another very obscenely and those things that were false and wishing very bad wishes and very often and she wish that when her child fell into the river that she had never pulled . ... her child out and Bibber use to wish ill wishes to herself and her children and also to others: the neighborhood where she lived amongst after she buried her first husband has told us that this John Bibber wife could fall into fits as often as she pleased.

References

External links
Profile, Vibert Family genealogical website
The Salem witchcraft papers, Volume 1: verbatim transcripts of the legal documents of the Salem witchcraft outbreak of 1692/edited and with an introduction and index by Paul Boyer and Stephen Nissenbaum
The 1692 Salem Witch Trials: Documents and Participants University of Virginia
Entries from Records of the Salem Witch-Hunt Linked to Digital Facsimile Images

1650s births
Date of birth unknown
Year of death unknown
People accused of witchcraft
People of the Salem witch trials
Accusers in witch trials